Samuel Lyle Orr (c. 1850–1930) was an Irish-born minister of the Free Church of Scotland who served as Moderator of the General Assembly in 1913/14. The Lyle Orr Awards have been granted by the Free Church of Scotland annually since 1914 to children showing great Bible knowledge.

Life

He was born in Kilraughts parish, Ballymoney, County Antrim c. 1850, where he became a teacher before deciding to become a minister.

In 1904 he was preaching in Armagh.

He moved from Northern Ireland to Glasgow in 1908.

He was minister of Milton Free Church in Glasgow living at 230 West Regent Street. Milton Free Church is now commonly called the St Vincent Street Church and is by the architect Greek Thomson. It was one of the architectural gems of the Free Church of Scotland, usually famed for their puritanical approach to church building.

In 1913 he was elected Moderator of the General Assembly, the highest position in the Free Church of Scotland. He was succeeded in 1914 by Finlay Macrae.

Some time around the First World War he moved to Saltcoats in Ayrshire.

He died at Ballyalbany, Monaghan, on 17 January 1930.

Family
He was married to Ann Henrietta Orr (1859-1913).

His son, James Orr, moved to Belfast and became a Dentist. He married Christina Hood from Galashiels. They had one daughter, Sheilagh Lyle Orr.

His daughter Henrietta (1886-1904) is buried at Monaghan with his wife.

Publications
Calvin's Idea of the Church in its Bearing on Our History (1909)
Historical Sketch of Ballyalbany Presbyterian Church (1940)

References

1850s births
1930 deaths
19th-century Irish people
20th-century Irish clergy
People from County Antrim
Year of birth uncertain
20th-century Ministers of the Free Church of Scotland